The 2017 All-Ireland Intermediate Hurling Championship was the 34th staging of the All-Ireland Intermediate Hurling Championship since its establishment by the Gaelic Athletic Association in 1961. The championship began on 12 July 2017 and ended on 23 July 2017.

Kilkenny entered the championship as the defending champions.

On 23 July 2017, Kilkenny won the championship following a 2-23 to 2-18 defeat of Cork in the All-Ireland final. This was their fifth championship overall and their second title in succession.

Teams

Overview

2017 championship saw the fewest teams participating in recent years. The Munster Intermediate Hurling Championship was not held as only Cork were interested in fielding a team (the Munster IHC was replaced in 2017 by a new Under 25 competition which was won by Limerick).

Summaries

Results

Leinster Intermediate Hurling Championship

Final

All-Ireland Intermediate Hurling Championship

Final

Scoring statistics

Top scorers overall

Top scorers in a single game

References

Intermediate
All-Ireland Intermediate Hurling Championship